Nick Moutrey (born June 24, 1995) is a Canadian professional ice hockey forward who currently plays for Ässät in the Finnish Liiga.

Playing career 
Moutrey played major junior hockey in the Ontario Hockey League (OHL) with the Saginaw Spirit and the North Bay Battalion. He was selected by the Columbus Blue Jackets in the fourth-round, 105th overall, of the 2013 NHL Entry Draft.

He was signed to a three-year, entry-level contract with the Blue Jackets on March 6, 2015. He made his professional debut in the 2015-16 season, assigned to the Blue Jackets American Hockey League affiliate, the Lake Erie Monsters, appearing in 56 regular season games and posting 11 points, before making two playoff appearances in helping the Monsters to claim the Calder Cup.

In his final season of his entry-level contract in the 2017–18 season, unable to make his debut with the Blue Jackets, Moutrey was traded to the Ottawa Senators along with a third-round selection in 2018 in exchange for Ian Cole on February 27, 2018. He was immediately assigned to the Senators AHL affiliate, the Belleville Senators, for the remainder of the season.

Following stints with the Rockford IceHogs and the Texas Stars, Moutrey left North America following 283 AHL games and signed his first European contract in agreeing to a one-year deal with Finnish top-tier club, Ässät of the Liiga, on August 25, 2021.

Career statistics

Awards and honours

References

External links

1995 births
Living people
Ässät players
Belleville Senators players
Canadian ice hockey forwards
Cleveland Monsters players
Columbus Blue Jackets draft picks
Lake Erie Monsters players
Manchester Monarchs (ECHL) players
North Bay Battalion players
Rockford IceHogs (AHL) players
Saginaw Spirit players
Texas Stars players